Mark Watts may refer to:

 Mark Watts (cricketer) (born 1963), English cricketer
 Rocket Watts (Mark Watts Jr., born 2000), American basketball player
 Mark F. Watts (born 1964), British member of the European Parliament, 1994–2004
 Mark Watts (journalist), freelance journalist who previously hosted the show Between the Headlines on Press TV

See also
Mark Watt (born 1996), Scottish cricketer